This is a list of trolleybus systems in Ukraine by oblast.  It includes all trolleybus systems, past and present.

Cherkasy Oblast

Chernihiv Oblast

Chernivtsi Oblast

Autonomous Republic of Crimea

Dnipropetrovsk Oblast

Donetsk Oblast

Ivano-Frankivsk Oblast

Kharkiv Oblast

Kherson Oblast

Khmelnytskyi Oblast

Kirovohrad Oblast

Kyiv

Kyiv Oblast

Luhansk Oblast

Lviv Oblast

Mykolaiv Oblast

Odessa Oblast

Poltava Oblast

Rivne Oblast

Sevastopol

Sumy Oblast

Ternopil Oblast

Vinnytsia Oblast

Volyn Oblast

Zaporizhzhia Oblast

Zhytomyr Oblast

See also
 List of trolleybus systems, for all other countries
 Trolleybuses in former Soviet Union countries
 Trolleybus usage by country
 List of town tramway systems
 List of light-rail transit systems
 List of rapid transit systems

References

Sources

Books and periodicals
 Murray, Alan. 2000. "World Trolleybus Encyclopaedia". Reading, Berkshire, UK: Trolleybooks.
 Peschkes, Robert. 1987. "World Gazetteer of Tram, Trolleybus and Rapid Transit Systems, Part Two: Asia & USSR /Africa/Australia". London: Rapid Transit Publications.
 "Straßenbahnatlas ehem. Sowjetunion / Tramway Atlas of the former USSR". 1996. Berlin: Arbeitsgemeinschaft Blickpunkt Straßenbahn, in conjunction with Light Rail Transit Association, London.
 Trolleybus Magazine (ISSN 0266-7452). National Trolleybus Association (UK). Bimonthly.

External links

Ukraine